Jimmy Conlin (October 14, 1884 – May 7, 1962) was an American character actor who appeared in almost 150 films in his 32-year career.

Career
Conlin was born in Camden, New Jersey in 1884, and his acting career started out in vaudeville, where he and his wife Myrtle Glass played the Keith-Albee-Orpheum circuits billed as "Conlin & Glass," a song-and-dance team.  They also starred together in two short films, Sharps and Flats (1928) and Zip! Boom! Bang! (1929) for Vitaphone. These early shorts display Conlin's musical talents, including his impressive skills at the piano. In later years Conlin became strictly a character comedian, with little opportunity to show his vaudeville skills.

Jimmy Conlin made another comedy short without Glass in 1930 (A Tight Squeeze), but his film career started in earnest in 1933, and for the next 27 years, with the single exception of 1951, every year saw the release of at least one film in which Conlin appeared – at the height of his career, often more than a dozen of them. Recognizable by his small size and odd appearance, Conlin played all sorts of small roles and bit parts, many times not receiving an onscreen credit. Today's audiences may remember him as the assistant bartender to W. C. Fields in My Little Chickadee, the collections agent in the Fred Astaire musical Second Chorus, the beggar posing as a blind man in Dick Tracy's Dilemma, and the elderly horse trainer in Rolling Home.

In the 1940s, Conlin was part of Preston Sturges' unofficial "stock company" of character actors, appearing in nine films written and directed by Sturges. His roles in Sturges' films were often sizable and often came with good billing. One of his best performances came in Sturges' The Sin of Harold Diddlebock in 1946, when he played "Wormy", the racetrack tout who convinces Harold Lloyd to have his first drink, setting off the events of the film.  The loyalty between Sturges and Conlin ran both ways, and when the former golden boy of Hollywood fell on hard times, Conlin remained a friend, stayed in contact, and helped out in any way he could.

Conlin did not make many television appearances, but he did have a regular role as a bartender on Duffy's Tavern, a syndicated series from 1954.  He made his final film in 1959, when he played a habitual criminal in Anatomy of a Murder.

Personal life 
Conlin's first wife, Myrtle Glass, died in 1945. They had been married 27 years. He later married the former Dorothy Ryan.

Death
Conlin died at his home in Encino, California on May 7, 1962, at the age of 77.

Selected filmography 

Sharps and Flats (1928, Short) - Himself
Grand Slam (1933) - Oscar Smelt (uncredited)
College Humor (1933) - Dr. Mandel
The Last Trail (1933) - Jimmy, Train Passenger (uncredited)
Footlight Parade (1933) - in the"Honeymoon Hotel" number  (uncredited)
The Bowery (1933) - Enlistee (uncredited)
Myrt and Marge (1933) - Comedian in Show (uncredited)
Advice to the Lovelorn (1933) - California Booster (uncredited)
Cross Country Cruise (1934) - Sid
City Limits (1934) - Nap
She Learned About Sailors (1934) - Irate Neighbor (uncredited)
365 Nights in Hollywood (1934) - Heeber, Student Actor (uncredited)
The Bride Comes Home (1935) - Len Noble
Rose Marie (1936) - Joe - Piano Player (uncredited)
And Sudden Death (1936) - Mr. Tweets
Rose Bowl (1936) - Browning Hills
The Accusing Finger (1936) - Bill Poster (uncredited)
Arizona Mahoney (1936) - Man in Hay Bill Gag (uncredited)
Find the Witness (1937) - Swifty Mullins (uncredited)
The Man Who Found Himself (1937) - Nosey Watson
Captains Courageous (1937) - Martin (uncredited)
Mountain Music (1937) - Medicine Show Shill (uncredited)
Living on Love (1937) - Man with Monkey (uncredited)
The Adventurous Blonde (1937) - Dr. Bolger
Mannequin (1937) - Elevator Operator (uncredited)
Crashing Hollywood (1938) - Crisby
Blondes at Work (1938) - Coroner (uncredited)
The Big Broadcast of 1938 (1938) - 1st Reporter (uncredited)
He Couldn't Say No (1938) - Ambulance Driver (uncredited)
Over the Wall (1938) - Davis' Handler (uncredited)
Torchy Blane in Panama (1938) - Botkin
Cocoanut Grove (1938) - Motel Proprietor (uncredited)
Prison Farm (1938) - Dave, the Grocer (uncredited)
Smashing the Rackets (1938) - Witness (uncredited)
Broadway Musketeers (1938) - Mr. Hobart Skinner
Hard to Get (1938) - Dour Diner (uncredited)
The Shining Hour (1938) - Man Shaving on Plane (uncredited)
Comet Over Broadway (1938) - Burlesque Comic (uncredited)
Sweethearts (1938) - Properties Man (uncredited)
Idiot's Delight (1939) - Stagehand (uncredited)
Nancy Drew... Reporter (1939) - Newspaper Morgue-Keeper (uncredited)
Torchy Runs for Mayor (1939) - Coroner (uncredited)
No Place to Go (1939) - Rivers
$1000 a Touchdown (1939) - Sheriff (uncredited)
The Amazing Mr. Williams (1939) - Master of Ceremonies (uncredited)
Calling Philo Vance (1940) - Dr. Doremus - Coroner
My Little Chickadee (1940) - Squawk Mulligan - Bartender (uncredited)
Honeymoon Deferred (1940) - Detective (uncredited)
Three Cheers for the Irish (1940) - Riley - Party Guest (uncredited)
King of the Lumberjacks (1940) - Jimmy, the Piano Player (uncredited)
Two Girls on Broadway (1940) - Poem Vendor (uncredited)
Edison, the Man (1940) - Waiter (uncredited)
The Way of All Flesh (1940) - Second Hobo (uncredited)
Florian (1940) - Stock Guard (uncredited)
Wagons Westward (1940) - Jake - Storekeeper (uncredited)
The Great McGinty (1940) - The Lookout - At Felgman's
Charlie Chan at the Wax Museum (1940) - Barker (uncredited)
Angels Over Broadway (1940) - Pawn Shop Proprietor (uncredited)
So You Won't Talk (1940) - Stagehand (uncredited)
Christmas in July (1940) - Arbuster (uncredited)
Friendly Neighbors (1940) - Storekeeper (uncredited)
Second Chorus (1940) - Mr. Dunn
Let's Make Music (1941) - Jim, the Pianist (uncredited)
Ridin' on a Rainbow (1941) - Joe
The Lady Eve (1941) - Second Ship's Waiter (uncredited)
Footlight Fever (1941) - First Furniture Mover (uncredited)
A Shot in the Dark (1941) - Hotel Desk Clerk (uncredited)
Hurry, Charlie, Hurry (1941) - Murphy, the Handyman (uncredited)
Out of the Fog (1941) - Card Game Kibitzer (uncredited)
Unexpected Uncle (1941) - Muriel's Husband (uncredited)
Man at Large (1941) - Stuttering Tenant (uncredited)
The Gay Falcon (1941) - Bartender at Party (uncredited)
New York Town (1941) - Burt the Newsman (uncredited)
Look Who's Laughing (1941) - Brush Salesman (uncredited)
Sullivan's Travels (1941) - Trustee
Call Out the Marines (1942) - Little Man (uncredited)
Obliging Young Lady (1942) - Mr. McIntyre - Linda's Neighbor (uncredited)
Woman of the Year (1942) - Reporter at Bar (uncredited)
The Lady Is Willing (1942) - Bum (uncredited)
The Remarkable Andrew (1942) - Private Henry Bartholomew Smith
Broadway (1942) - Newsman (uncredited)
Private Buckaroo (1942) - Uncle (uncredited)
Are Husbands Necessary? (1942) - Mover (uncredited)
The Palm Beach Story (1942) - Mr. Asweld
The Man in the Trunk (1942) - Debt Collector (uncredited)
The Forest Rangers (1942) - Otto Hanson
Madame Spy (1942) - Winston
Ice-Capades Revue (1942) - Biddle (uncredited)
Calaboose (1943) - Charlie the Drunk (uncredited)
Slightly Dangerous (1943) - Bartender at Opera (uncredited)
Taxi, Mister (1943) - Cassidy, Disgruntled ex-Ballplayer
Jitterbugs (1943) - Barker for Bearded Lady (uncredited)
Hitler's Madman (1943) - Dvorak - the Shopkeeper
Dixie (1943) - Publisher (uncredited)
Petticoat Larceny (1943) - Jitters
This is the Army (1943) - Stage Doorman (uncredited)
Swing Shift Maisie (1943) - Man at Meeting (uncredited)
Old Acquaintance (1943) - Frank - Photographer (uncredited)
The Miracle of Morgan's Creek (1943) - Mayor (uncredited)
Ali Baba and the Forty Thieves (1944) - Little Thief
It Happened Tomorrow (1944) - Man at Boardinghouse (uncredited)
And the Angels Sing (1944) - Messenger (uncredited)
Gambler's Choice (1944) - Nicky (uncredited)
Man from Frisco (1944) - Mayor's Secretary (uncredited)
Hail the Conquering Hero (1944) - Judge Dennis
Summer Storm (1944) - Man Mailing Letter (uncredited)
The Great Moment (1944) - Mr. Burnett, Pharmacist (uncredited)
Lost in a Harem (1944) - Arab Follower (uncredited)
Army Wives (1944) - Stan
The Town Went Wild (1944) - Lemuel Jones, Justice of the Peace
Bring on the Girls (1945) - Justice of the Peace (uncredited)
The Picture of Dorian Gray (1945) - Pub Pianist (uncredited)
It's a Pleasure (1945) - Messenger (uncredited)
G.I. Honeymoon (1945) - Telegram Messenger (uncredited)
Honeymoon Ahead (1945) - Grant (uncredited)
Don Juan Quilligan (1945) - Marriage Bureau Clerk (uncredited)
Penthouse Rhythm (1945) - Justice of the Peace (uncredited)
Fallen Angel (1945) - Walton Hotel Clerk (uncredited)
An Angel Comes to Brooklyn (1945) - Cornelius Terwilliger
Whistle Stop (1946) - Al - the Barber
Two Sisters from Boston (1946) - Grandpa Chandler (uncredited)
Blue Skies (1946) - Jeffrey - Valet (uncredited)
Rolling Home (1946) - Grandpa Crawford
Cross My Heart (1946) - Jury Foreman (uncredited)
It's a Joke, Son! (1947) - Senator Alexander P. Leeds
The Sin of Harold Diddlebock (1947) - Wormy
Dick Tracy's Dilemma (1947) - Sightless
Seven Keys to Baldpate (1947) - Pete the Hermit
The Trouble with Women (1947) - Mr. Pooler (uncredited)
The Hucksters (1947) - Blake - Blue Penguin Inn Proprietor
Mourning Becomes Electra (1947) - Abner Small
Smart Woman (1948) - Miller (uncredited)
Hazard (1948) - Mr. Tilson
Knock on Any Door (1949) - Kid Fingers (uncredited)
Tulsa (1949) - Homer Triplette
Prejudice (1949) - Young Joe
The Inspector General (1949) - Turnkey (uncredited)
The Great Rupert (1950) - Joe Mahoney
Operation Haylift (1950) - Ed North
Sideshow (1950) - Johnny
On Dangerous Ground (1951) - Doc Hyman (uncredited)
The Jazz Singer (1952) - Mr. Demming, Photographer (uncredited)
It Happens Every Thursday (1953) - Matthew
The Seven Little Foys (1954) - Stage Doorman in 1898 Chicago (uncredited)
Anatomy of a Murder (1959) - Clarence Madigan
The 30 Foot Bride of Candy Rock (1959) - Magruder

References

External links

1884 births
1962 deaths
Male actors from New Jersey
American male film actors
Vaudeville performers
Actors from Camden, New Jersey
20th-century American male actors